Kékszalag or the Blue Ribbon Round the Lake Balaton Race is an international sports event held in Hungary every year between more than 30 boat classes. The regatta starts and finishes in Balatonfüred, after the 155+km circumnavigation of the Lake Balaton. By today the regatta became Europe's most prestigious and oldest (the first was held in 1934) existing round a lake competition (Bol d’Or Mirabaud is since 1939, and Centomiglia is since 1951). The Blue Ribbon's course is the longest among the main European round the lake events and nowadays has also the largest fleet competing (612 sailboats in 2009). During the race, the Transportation Rules of Inland Waterways apply. From 2014 the Hungarian Yachting Association has lifted the restrictions regarding multi-hull sailboats and today the race is open to everybody in the spirit of the founders.

Absolute winners 

 1934 Gábor Ugron – Rabonbán I (30 Square Metre Yacht)
 1936 Béla Kovács – Kincsem III (22 jolle)
 1938 Béla Kovács – Kincsem IV (22 jolle)
 1940 Evelin Gordon (Kultsár Istvánné) (First woman to win) – Tramontana
 1942 Evelin Gordon (Kultsár Istvánné) – Tramontana.
 1947 Kálmán Tóth – Hungária
 1949 János Mihálkovics – Vészmadár
 1951 István Németh – Nemere II.
 1953 István Németh – Nemere II.
 1955 István Németh – Nemere II. (75-Square Metre Yacht)
 1959 Boldizsár Horváth – Addió (40-Square Metre Yacht)
 1961 László Farkas – Kékmadár
 1963 Pál Vályi – Tramontana
 1965 László Tolnai – Olimpia III.
 1967 Tibor Debrőczy – Trinidad
 1969 Lajos Berta – Rabonbán II. (30-Square Metre Yacht)
 1971 Balázs Bucsy – Tramontana
 1973 András Gosztonyi – Blott X.
 1975 István Telegdy – Blott X. (star)
 1977 József Lovas – Tramontana
 1979 József Lovas – Tramontana
 1981 Szabolcs Izsák – Hárpia
 1983 Richter Zdenka – Simi
 1985 Steeg Eindl – Simsalabin
 1987 Steeg Eindl – Simsalabin
 1989 Pál Gömöry – Tramontana
 1991 Helmuth Birkmayer & György Balogh tie – Gitzwerg and Nemere II.
 1993 Miklós Tuss – Manual
 1995 Miklós Tuss – Manual
 1997 Christoph Wieser – Liberté
 1999 Szabolcs Detre – Yuppie
 2001 Farkas Litkey – Pleasure
 2002 Farkas Litkey – Gardazzurra
 2003 Farkas Litkey – Lisa
 2004 Farkas Litkey – Gardazzurra
 2005 Farkas Litkey – Liza
 2006 Farkas Litkey – Clan Des Team
 2007 Farkas Litkey – Lisa
 2008 Farkas Litkey – Clan Des Team
 2009 Farkas Litkey – Lisa
 2010 Roland Gabler – NaturAqua
 2011 Farkas Litkey – Lisa
 2012 Márton Józsa – Fifty-Fifty
 2013 Farkas Litkey – Evopro-Lisa
 2014 Márton Józsa – Fifty-Fitfty
 2015 Christophe Peclard – Safram
 2016 Farkas Litkey – Festipay (catamaran)
 2017 Farkas Litkey – Festipay
 2018 Christophe Peclard – Safram
 2019 Zoltán Petrányi – Racing Django 
 2020 Róbert Vándor – RSM2 
 2021 Róbert Vándor – RSM2
 2022 Márton Józsa – Fifty-Fitfty

References

Sources 

 Érdekességek, amiket jó tudni a Kékszalag versenyről
 KARDINÁLIS JELEK
 The Race's Official Website

Sailing regattas
Lake Balaton